The Centrobasket is a FIBA-sponsored international basketball tournament where national teams from Central America and the Caribbean participate. These countries make up the Central American and Caribbean Basketball Confederation (CONCENCABA). The top three or four Women's National teams typically earn berths to the FIBA Women's AmeriCup, from which they can qualify for the FIBA Basketball World Cup or Summer Olympics. Teams qualify for these tournaments by finishing high (usually first or second place) in the previous Centrobasket or by placing high at the FIBA COCABA Championship for Mexico and the seven Central American countries and at the FIBA CBC Championship for the 23 Caribbean countries. In total, 31 countries have an opportunity to qualify their national teams for Centrobasket, yet all of them do not enter teams regularly.

History
Celebration of the tournament typically is every two years. Initially played only in odd years, the tournament has, in recent years, it has moved to even years since 2004. The tournament was not held in either 1979 or 1983, but with those exceptions, the tournament has been held every other year, excepting for subsequent tournaments in 2003 and 2004.

Eight teams participate at the tournament, divided into two groups. The first round of the tournament consists of a round-robin, and then, in the second round, teams compete to define their final position at the tournament's standing.

Panama and Puerto Rico have been multiple medal winners at this event, both considered the strongest teams in the region, even though the Puerto Rican team almost never sends its best players for this competition (it mostly sends its second team). To date, Puerto Rico has earned large number of medals in every tournament that it has participated in.

Men's tournament

Summary

Performances by nation

Participation details

Women's tournament

Summary

Performances by nation

References
FIBA Archive
Panama History
Puerto Rico & Dominican Republic History
Cuba FIBA History
Virgin Islands Partial History for first two competitions
Caribbean Basketball Confederation
Todor66.com Centrobasket

 
Basketball competitions in North America between national teams
Basketball competitions in Central America